Andre DeAngelo Ellington (born February 3, 1989) is a former American football running back. He played college football at Clemson and was drafted by the Arizona Cardinals in the sixth round of the 2013 NFL Draft.

High school career
Ellington attended Berkeley High School, where he played high school football for the Stags football team. As a senior, he rushed for 1,822 yards and 24 touchdowns, and also added four other touchdowns (two receiving, two kickoff return). He accumulated 2,519 all-purpose yards as a senior. ESPN named him the #44 overall prospect and #6 running back.

Ellington also ran track and field for the Berkeley High School track team. He ran a personal-best time of 10.97 seconds in the 100 meters at the 2006 Taco Bell Classic Meet. He also recorded a time of 23.13 seconds in the 200 meters. He was also a member of the 4 × 100 m (42.94 s) relay squad.

He picked Clemson over scholarship offers from Florida, Georgia, Kentucky, Maryland, North Carolina, South Carolina, and Tennessee.

College career

Freshman season (2009)
After redshirting his true freshman season in 2008, Ellington had 546 total yards on 79 touches. He rushed for 72 yards on nine carries against Middle Tennessee.

Sophomore season (2010)
As a sophomore, Ellington was named second-team All-ACC by Rivals.com. He rushed for 686 yards on 118 carries and 10 touchdowns. He caught 12 passes for 109 yards and a touchdown. Ellington had 140 yards in 22 carries and four catches for 48 yards against eventual national champion Auburn.

Junior season (2011)
As a junior, Ellington rushed for 1,178 yards on 223 attempts scoring 11 touchdowns.  Additionally, he caught 22 passes for 109 yards. He earned second-team all-conference honors in recognition of his successful season.

In the 2011 ACC Championship Game, he ran for 125 yards and one touchdown on 20 carries, as the Tigers beat the Virginia Tech Hokies, 38–10.

Clemson lost the 2012 Orange Bowl to the West Virginia Mountaineers, by a 70–33 scoreline. Ellington rushed for 116 yards from 10 carries, including a 68-yard run for the game's opening touchdown.

Senior season (2012)
In his final season as a senior, Ellington rushed for 1,081 yards on 212 attempts (5.1 avg) while scoring eight touchdowns. He also caught 14 passes for 232 yards and a touchdown. He earned first-team all-conference honors. He finished his college career at fourth on Clemson's list of all-time rushers with 3,436 yards, just below former teammate C. J. Spiller, and finished third in rushing touchdowns with 33. Ellington graduated from Clemson in December 2012 with a bachelor's degree in parks, recreation, and tourism management.

Career statistics

Professional career

Ellington ran a 4.61 40-yard dash at the NFL Scouting Combine, considerably slower than many anticipated, as he had multiple runs of over twenty yards during his final year at Clemson.

Arizona Cardinals

2013 season
After being projected as a second or third round pick, he slid to the third day of the draft. He was selected in the sixth round of the 2013 NFL Draft with the 187th overall pick by the Arizona Cardinals. He scored his first career touchdown on a pass reception from Carson Palmer in Week 2 of the 2013 season against the Detroit Lions. In Week 8 of the 2013 season, Ellington rushed for 154 yards against the Atlanta Falcons, the highest rushing total of the week. He finished his rookie season with 652 rushing yards on 118 attempts (5.5 avg) and three touchdowns, and also caught 39 passes for 371 yards and a touchdown.

2014 season
Ellington was placed on season ending injured reserve after Week 14, having injured his hip. 2014 was a very underwhelming sophomore season for Ellington, recording 660 rushing yards and three rushing touchdowns while averaging only 3.3 yards per carry.

2015 season
After the additions of running backs Chris Johnson and David Johnson, Ellington's role in the Arizona offense was severely reduced. He did make good use of his time on the field by recording 289 rushing yards and three touchdowns on 45 carries to average an astonishing 6.4 yards per carry. In Week 10 against the Seattle Seahawks, Ellington rushed for the 48-yard game-winning touchdown.

2016 season
In 2016, Ellington was the Cardinals third running back behind David Johnson and Chris Johnson to start the season. He was then moved up to the number two back after Chris Johnson suffered a season-ending groin injury in Week 4. Ellington ended the 2016 season playing in all 16 games rushing for 96 yards and recording 12 catches for 85 yards.

2017 season
On March 13, 2017, Ellington signed a one-year contract extension with the Cardinals. On March 29, 2017, Cardinals head coach Bruce Arians announced that Ellington would be changing his position to wide receiver for the 2017 season.

On November 20, 2017, Ellington was waived by the Cardinals.

Houston Texans
On November 21, 2017, Ellington was claimed off waivers by the Houston Texans. Ellington ended the 2017 season with a cumulative 20 carries for 55 yards and a touchdown along with 39 receptions for 369 yards.

Tampa Bay Buccaneers
On February 19, 2019, Ellington signed with the Tampa Bay Buccaneers. On August 31, 2019, Ellington was released by the Buccaneers.

NFL career statistics

Personal life
His cousin, Bruce Ellington, is a former NFL wide receiver. The two were teammates on the 2017 Texans.

References

External links

 
 Clemson Tigers bio

1989 births
Living people
African-American players of American football
People from Moncks Corner, South Carolina
Players of American football from South Carolina
American football running backs
Clemson Tigers football players
Arizona Cardinals players
Houston Texans players
Tampa Bay Buccaneers players
21st-century African-American sportspeople
20th-century African-American people